Marie-Noëlle (also Marie-Noelle) is a French language feminine name, composed of the names Marie and Noëlle. Notable people with the name include:

 Marie-Noëlle Ada (born 1990), Gabonese beauty pageant titleholder
 Marie-Noëlle Koyara (born 1955), Minister of State of Defense of the Central African Republic
 Marie-Noëlle Lienemann (born 1951), French politician; Member of the European Parliament
 Marie-Noelle Marquis (born 1979), French-Canadian actress
 Marie-Noëlle Savigny (born 1957), French athlete who specialized in the 100 meters hurdles
 Marie-Noëlle Thémereau (born 1950), president of the government of New Caledonia

See also 

 Marie (given name)
 Noelle

Compound given names
French feminine given names